Zamia standleyi is a species of plant in the family Zamiaceae. It is endemic to Honduras,  and is threatened by habitat loss.

References

standleyi
Endemic flora of Honduras
Taxonomy articles created by Polbot